Hirtz is a surname. Notable people with the surname include:

 Alexander Charles Hirtz (born 1945), botanist
 Arnold Hirtz (born 1910), Swiss ice hockey player
 Georg Daniel Hirtz (1804–1893), Alsatian master turner and poet

See also
 Hirtz compass, a medical device